Spodiopogon formosanus or the Taiwan oil millet (syn.: Eccoilopus formosanus) is a species of perennial grass in the family Poaceae. It is endemic to Taiwan. It is traditionally grown as a cereal crop by the Taiwanese aborigines.

Its wild progenitor is most likely Spodiopogon cotulifer, which is found in Taiwan and also in mainland China.

For most of the 20th century, the Taiwan oil millet had been misidentified as Echinochloa esculenta (the Japanese barnyard millet or hie 稗) until it was "rediscovered" by Dorian Fuller in the 2000s with the proper identification of specimens as Spodiopogon formosanus.

Cultivation
In the Rukai village of Vedray (霧台 Wutai), the Paiwan village of Masilid, and the Bunun village of Tahun, the Taiwan oil millet is grown alongside other cereal crops such as rice, foxtail millet, sorghum, and Job's tears (and also finger millet and proso millet in Tahun).

The Bunun, Rukai, and Paiwan peoples often sow foxtail millet and Taiwan oil millet simultaneously from winter to early spring. Although foxtail millet is typically harvested during mid-summer, Taiwan oil millet is harvested in late autumn.

Common names
Common names for Spodiopogon formosanus in Formosan languages:

Amis (?): samuk
Bunun: diirh; diil
Tsou: ihalumay, hrome; herome
Rukai: lhaomai; larumai, irome
Paiwan: rumay; jumai, lumai, lyumai

Common names from Yuasa (2001):

Saaroa: naumi
Kanakanabu: hrome

Most of the lexical forms reconstruct to *Numay.

It is also occasionally referred to as the Formosan beard grass or Taiwan hill millet.

References

formosanus
Endemic flora of Taiwan
Plants described in 1904
Millets
Cereals